Zhongzhan District is a district of the city of Jiaozuo, Henan province, China, bordering Shanxi province to the northwest.

Administrative divisions
As 2012, this district is divided to 10 subdistricts.
Subdistricts

References

County-level divisions of Henan
Jiaozuo